Ancient Christian Writers: the works of the Fathers in translation (abbreviated as ACW) is a book series with English translations of works by early Christian writers. The translations are made from Latin and Greek. The series was founded by Johannes Quasten and Joseph C. Plumpe, the first volume being published in 1946.

Editors and publishers

Editors
Vols. 1–27: Johannes Quasten and Joseph C. Plumpe
Vols. 28–33: Johannes Quasten and 
Vols. 34–46: Johannes Quasten, Walter J. Burghardt, and Thomas Comerford Lawler
Vols. 47–53: Walter J. Burghardt and Thomas Comerford Lawler
Vols. 54–55: Walter J. Burghardt, Thomas Comerford Lawler, and John J. Dillon
Vols. 56–57: Walter J. Burghardt, John J. Dillon, and Dennis D. McManus
Vols. 58–60: Walter J. Burghardt and John J. Dillon (editorial board), Dennis D. McManus (managing editor)
Vols. 61–62: John Dillon (editorial board) and Dennis D. McManus (managing editor)
Vol. 63: Boniface Ramsey, John Dillon, Jeremy Driscoll, Thomas Macy Finn, Thomas L. Knoebel, Joseph Lienhard, John A. McGuckin (advisory board)

Publishers
Newman Press (earlier volumes; later an imprint of Paulist Press)
Paulist Press (later volumes)

List of volumes
(1946) The Epistles of St. Clement of Rome and St. Ignatius of Antioch (translated and annotated by James A. Kleist, SJ) 
(1946) St. Augustine. The First Catechetical Instruction (translated and annotated by Joseph P. Christopher) 
(1946) St. Augustine. Faith, Hope, and Charity (translated and annotated by Louis A. Arand, SS) 
(1947) Julianus Pomerius. The Contemplative Life (translated and annotated by Mary Josephine Suelzer) 
(1948) St. Augustine. The Lord's Sermon on the Mount (translated by John J. Epson, SS; introduction by Johannes Quasten; notes by Joseph C. Plumpe) 
(1948) The Didache. The Epistle of Barnabas. The Epistles and the Martyrdom of St. Polycarp. The Fragments of Papias. The Epistle to Diognetus (translated and annotated by James A. Kleist, SJ) 
(1949) Arnobius of Sicca. The Case Against the Pagans. Vol. 1: Introduction, Books 1—3 (translated and annotated by George E. McCracken) 
(1949) Arnobius of Sicca. The Case Against the Pagans. Vol. 2: Books IV—VII, index (translated and annotated by George E. McCracken) 
(1950) St. Augustine. The Greatness of the Soul. The Teacher (translated and annotated by Joseph M. Colleran, CSsR) 
(1950) St. Athanasius. The Life of Saint Anthony (translated and annotated by Robert T. Meyer) 
(1950) St. Gregory the Great. Pastoral Care (translated and annotated by Henry Davis, SJ) 
(1950) St. Augustine. Against the Academics (translated and annotated by John J. O’Meara) 
(1951) Tertullian. Treatises on Marriage and Remarriage: To His Wife; An Exhortation to Chastity; Monogamy (translated and annotated by William P. Le Saint, SJ) 
(1952) St. Prosper of Aquitaine. The Call of All Nations (translated and annotated by P. De Letter, SJ) 
(1952) St. Augustine. Sermons for Christmas and Epiphany [Sermons 51, 140, 184—204 Ben.] (translated and annotated by Thomas Comerford Lawler) 
(1952) St. Irenaeus. Proof of the Apostolic Preaching (translated and annotated by Joseph P. Smith, SJ) 
(1953) The works of St. Patrick. St. Secundinus: Hymn on St. Patrick (translated and annotated by Ludwig Bieler) 
(1954) St. Gregory of Nyssa. The Lord's Prayer. The Beatitudes (translated and annotated by Hilda C. Graef) 
(1954) Origen. Prayer. Exhortation to Martyrdom (translated and annotated by John J. O’Meara) 
(1955) Rufinus. A Commentary on the Apostles' Creed (translated and annotated by J.N.D. Kelly) 
(1955) St. Maximus the Confessor. The ascetic life. The four centuries on charity (translated and annotated by Polycarp Sherwood, OSB) 
(1955) St. Augustine. The problem of free choice (translated and annotated by Dom Mark Pontifex) 
(1956) Athenagoras. Embassy for the Christians. The resurrection of the dead (translated and annotated by Joseph Hugh Crehan, SJ) 
(1956) Tertullian. The treatise against Hermogenes (translated and annotated by J.H. Waszink) 
(1957) St. Cyprian. The lapsed. The unity of the Catholic Church (translated and annotated by Maurice Bévenot, SJ) 
(1957) Origen. The Song of Songs: commentary and homilies (translated and annotated by R.P. Lawson) 
(1958) St. Methodius. The symposium: a treatise on chastity (translated and annotated by Herbert Musurillo, SJ) 
(1959) Tertullian. Treatises on penance: On penitence and On purity (translated and annotated by William P. Le Saint, SJ) 
(1960) St. Augustine, On the Psalms. Vol. I: Psalms 1–29 (translated and annotated by Dame Scholastica Hebgin and Dame Felicitas Corrigan) 
(1961) St. Augustine, On the Psalms. Vol. II: Psalms 30–37 (translated and annotated by Dame Scholastica Hebgin and Dame Felicitas Corrigan) 
(1963) St. John Chrysostom. Baptismal instructions (translated and annotated by Paul W. Harkins) 
(1963) Prosper of Aquitaine. Defense of St. Augustine (translated and annotated by P. De Letter, SJ) 
(1963) The letters of St. Jerome. Vol. 1: Letters 1–22 (translated by Charles Christopher Mierow, introduction and notes by Thomas Comerford Lawler) 
(1965) Palladius. The Lausiac History (translated and annotated by Robert T. Meyer) 
(1966) Letters of St. Paulinus of Nola. Vol. 1: Letters 1–22 (translated and annotated by ) 
(1967) Letters of St. Paulinus of Nola. Vol. 2: Letters 23–51 (translated and annotated by P.G. Walsh) 
(1970) Firmicus Maternus. The error of the pagan religions (translated and annotated by ) 
(1970) Egeria. Diary of a pilgrimage (translated and annotated by George E. Gingras) 
(1974) The Octavius of Marcus Minucius Felix (translated and annotated by ) 
(1975) The Poems of St. Paulinus of Nola (translated and annotated by P.G. Walsh) 
(1982) St. Augustine. The Literal Meaning of Genesis. Vol. 1: Books 1—6 (translated and annotated by John Hammond Taylor, SJ) 
(1982) St. Augustine. The Literal Meaning of Genesis. Vol. 2: Books 7–12 (translated and annotated by John Hammond Taylor, SJ) 
(1984) The Letters of St. Cyprian of Carthage. Vol. 1: Letters 1–27 (translated and annotated by G.W. Clarke) 
(1984) The Letters of St. Cyprian of Carthage. Vol. 2: Letters 28–54 (translated and annotated by G.W. Clarke) 
(1985) Palladius. Dialogue on the Life of St. John Chrysostom (translated and annotated by Robert T. Meyer) 
(1986) The Letters of St. Cyprian of Carthage. Vol. 3: Letters 55–66 (translated and annotated by G.W. Clarke) 
(1989) The Letters of St. Cyprian of Carthage. Vol. 4: Letters 67–82 (translated and annotated by G.W. Clarke) 
(1988) St. Augustine. On Faith and Works (translated and annotated by Gregory J. Lombardo, CSC, STD) 
(1988) Theodoret of Cyrus. On Divine Providence (translated and annotated by Thomas Halton) 
(1989) Sermons of St. Maximus of Turin (translated and annotated by Boniface Ramsey, OP) 
(1990) Cassiodorus. Explanation of the Psalms. Vol. 1: Psalms 1–50 [1–51(50)] (translated and annotated by P.G. Walsh) 
(1991) Cassiodorus. Explanation of the Psalms. Vol. 2: Psalms 51–100 [52(51)–101(100)] (translated and annotated by P.G. Walsh) 
(1991) Cassiodorus. Explanation of the Psalms. Vol. 3: Psalms 101–150 [102(101)–150] (translated and annotated by P.G. Walsh) 
(1992) Origen. Treatise on the Passover and Dialogue of Origen with Heraclides and his Fellow Bishops on the Father, the Son, and the Soul (translated and annotated by Robert J. Daly, SJ) 
(1992) St. Irenaeus of Lyons. Against the Heresies. Volume I: Book I (translated and annotated by Dominic J. Unger, OFM Cap; with further revisions by John J. Dillon) 
(1997) St. Justin Martyr. The First and Second Apologies (translated with introduction and notes by Leslie William Barnard) 
(1997) John Cassian. The Conferences (translated and annotated by Boniface Ramsey, OP) 
(2000) John Cassian. The Institutes (translated and annotated by Boniface Ramsey, OP) 
(2003) Evagrius Ponticus. Ad monachos (translation and commentary by Jeremy Driscoll, OSB) 
(2004) Quodvultdeus of Carthage. The Creedal Homilies (translation and commentary by Thomas Macy Finn) 
(2008) Isidore of Seville. De ecclesiasticis officiis (translation and introduction by Thomas L. Knoebel) 
(2010) Origen. Homilies 1–14 on Ezekiel (translation and introduction by Thomas P. Scheck) 
(2010) Julian of Toledo. Prognosticum futuri saeculi: Foreknowledge of the World to Come (translated, edited and introduced by Sergio Stancati, OP). 
(2012) St. Irenaeus of Lyons. Against the Heresies. Book 3 (Matthew C Steenberg) 
(2012) St. Irenaeus of Lyons. Against the Heresies. Book 2 (Dominic J. Unger) 
(2012) St. Jerome. Commentary on Ecclesiastes (Richard J. Goodrich) 
(2013) Theodoret of Cyrus. A Cure for Pagan Maladies (translation and introduction by Thomas Halton) 
(2015) St. Jerome. Commentary on Isaiah. Including St. Jerome's translation of Origen's Homilies 1-9 on Isaiah (translated and with an Introduction by Thomas P. Scheck) 
(2015) Theodore the Studite. Writing on Iconoclasn (translated and introduced by Thomas Cattoi) 
(2016) Sulpicius Severus. Complete Works (introduction, translation, and notes by Richard J. Goodrich) 
(2017) St. Jerome. Commentary on Ezekiel (translated with an introduction by Thomas P. Scheck) 
?
(2018) Isidore of Seville. Sententiae (translated and with notes by Thomas L. Knoebel) 
(2020) The Teachings of the Desert Fathers: Verba Seniorum III, VI, and VII (translated and introduced by Richard J. Goodrich) 
(2018) Chromatius of Aquileia. Sermons and Tractates on Matthew (translated and introduced by Thomas P. Scheck)

See also

Ante-Nicene Fathers
Nicene and Post-Nicene Fathers
The Fathers of the Church

References

Sources
Paulist Press
List of volumes 1—40 at the end of vol. 40

Ancient Christians
Ancient writers
Book series introduced in 1946
Christian law
History of Christianity
Publications of patristic texts
Translations into English